Arthur Ecrément (June 29, 1879 – June 23, 1958) was a Canadian lawyer and politician. Ecrément was a Member of Parliament.

Born in St-Gabriel-de-Brandon, Quebec, he was a notary before being elected as a Liberal for the Quebec riding of Berthier in 1908. He was defeated in 1911 and 1917.

References

1879 births
1958 deaths
Liberal Party of Canada MPs
Members of the House of Commons of Canada from Quebec